Connor Hampson (born 11 November 1998) is a German rugby league footballer who currently plays for the Halifax RLFC reserve grade side.

Career
Hampson represents Germany internationally, making his debut for the nation in 2018 against Czech Republic in the 2021 Men's Rugby League World Cup qualifying.

References

Living people
1998 births
English rugby league players
German rugby league players
Germany national rugby league team players
Rugby league props